Francis II may refer to:

 Francis II, Duke of Brittany (1433–1488)
 Francesco II Gonzaga, Marquess of Mantua (1466–1519), ruler of the Italian city of Mantua
 Francis II of France (1544–1560), king of France
 Francis II, Duke of Lorraine (1572–1632), son of Charles III, Duke of Lorraine, and Claude of Valois
 Francesco II d'Este, Duke of Modena (1660–1694)
 Francis II Rákóczi (1676–1735), Prince of Transylvania
 Francis II, Holy Roman Emperor (1768–1835), last Holy Roman Emperor
 Francis II of the Two Sicilies (1836–1894), last king of the Two Sicilies
 Franz, Duke of Bavaria (born 1933), called "Francis II" by supporters of the Jacobite claim to the thrones of England, Scotland, Ireland, and France
 Francis II, Duke of Saxe-Lauenburg (1547–1619), third son of Francis I of Saxe-Lauenburg and Sybille of Saxe-Freiberg

See also 
Francesco II (disambiguation)